Ave-Lii Laas (born 12 February 1999) is an Estonian footballer who plays as a midfielder for Estonian Naiste Meistriliiga club Põlva FC Lootos and for the Estonia national team.

Club career
From Põlva, Laas started training with the youth team of FC Lootos in 2009. In 2012, 2014 and 2015 she won Estonian youth titles with the club's different age groups.

FC Lootos
In 2015, she started in FC Lootos' senior squad in the Esiliiga, the second level of women's football in Estonia. Team finished on the third place. Next year FC Lootos finished on the second place and was promoted to the top level Naiste Meistriliiga.

References

External links
 Naiskonna kapten loodab jätkuvale edule Lõuna-Eesti Postimees, 19 June 2020

Estonian women's footballers
Estonia women's international footballers
People from Põlva
Living people
1999 births
Women's association football midfielders